Mill Hill is a suburb of Johannesburg, South Africa. It is located in Region 3. It is adjacent to Bryanston.

References

Johannesburg Region B